Pedro Leal may refer to:
 Pedro Leal (footballer) (born 1989), Costa Rican football player
 Pedro Leal (rugby union) (born 1984), Portuguese rugby player
 Pedro Rosso Leal, ambassador of Cuba to Angola